Anthony "Tony" Marshall Sims (born October 14, 1985) is an American mixed martial artist who competes in the lightweight division. He is best known for competing in the Ultimate Fighting Championship (UFC).

Background
Tony grew up with an older brother in Davenport, Iowa. Urged by their single mother to find some activities, Tony started boxing at the age of seven. He also picked up wrestling at the age of 12. Tony completed his undergraduate degrees in Architecture and Engineering from Iowa State University before completing his graduate studies in University of Minnesota.

Mixed martial arts career

Ultimate Fighting Championship 
Sims made his UFC debut against Steve Montgomery on June 27, 2015 at UFC Fight Night: Machida vs. Romero. He won the fight by knockout in the first round.

Sims next fought Olivier Aubin-Mercier on short notice at UFC Fight Night: Holloway vs. Oliveira on August 23, 2015, replacing an injured Chris Wade.  He lost the fight to Aubin-Mercier by unanimous decision.

Sims faced Abel Trujillo on January 20, 2016 at UFC 195.  He lost the fight by guillotine choke in the first round. He was subsequently released from the promotion.

Championships and accomplishments
Prize FC
 Prize FC Lightweight Championship (one time)
Two successful title defenses
Fight to Win
 Fight to Win Lightweight Championship (one time)
One successful title defense

Mixed martial arts record 

|-
| Loss
|align=center| 12–4
| Abel Trujillo
| Submission (guillotine choke)
| UFC 195
|
|align=center|1
|align=center|3:18
|Las Vegas, Nevada, United States
|
|-
| Loss
|align=center| 12–3
| Olivier Aubin-Mercier
| Decision (unanimous)
| UFC Fight Night: Holloway vs. Oliveira
|
|align=center|3
|align=center|5:00
|Saskatoon, Saskatchewan, Canada
|
|-
| Win
|align=center| 12–2
| Steve Montgomery
| KO (punches)
| UFC Fight Night: Machida vs. Romero
|
|align=center|1
|align=center|2:43
|Hollywood, Florida, United States
|
|-
| Win
|align=center| 11–2
| Anselmo Luna
| TKO (punches)
| FTW: Machines
|
|align=center|3
|align=center|0:39
|Denver, Colorado, United States
|
|-
| Win
|align=center| 10–2
| Joshua Sandvig
| TKO (doctor stoppage)
| FTW: Prize Fighting Championship 8
|
|align=center|2
|align=center|5:00
|Denver, Colorado, United States
|
|-
| Win
|align=center| 9–2
| James Steele McCall
| TKO (punches)
| FTW: Animals
|
|align=center|2
|align=center|0:13
|Denver, Colorado, United States
|
|-
| Loss
|align=center| 8–2
| Drew Dober
| Decision (split)
| FTW: Prize Fighting Championship 4
|
|align=center|3
|align=center|5:00
|Denver, Colorado, United States
|
|-
| Win
|align=center| 8–1
| Mitchell Hale
| TKO (punches)
| FTW: Prize Fighting Championship 3
|
|align=center|1
|align=center|3:07
|Midland, Texas, United States
|
|-
| Win
|align=center| 7–1
| Thomas Denny
| KO (punches)
| FTW: Prize Fighting Championship 2
|
|align=center|1
|align=center|1:08
|Denver, Colorado, United States
|
|-
| Win
|align=center| 6–1
| Chase Hackett
| KO (punch)
| FTW: Prize Fighting Championship 1
|
|align=center|1
|align=center|3:09
|Denver, Colorado, United States
|
|-
| Win
|align=center| 5–1
| Chris Bennett
| Submission (guillotine choke)
| MMA Big Show: A Prodigy Returns
|
|align=center|1
|align=center|3:51
|Florence, Indiana, United States
|
|-
| Win
|align=center| 4–1
| Josh Shaffer
| TKO (punches)
| KOTC: Ice Age
|
|align=center|1
|align=center|0:14
|Mahnomen, Minnesota, United States
|
|-
| Win
|align=center| 3–1
| Aaron Beeman
| Submission (rear-naked choke)
| Brutaal: Fight Nation
|
|align=center|2
|align=center|2:30
|Boone, Iowa, United States
|
|-
| Win
|align=center| 2–1
| Gabe Walbridge
| TKO (punches)
| Barrera Promotions: Fightfest
|
|align=center|2
|align=center|1:40
|Somerset, Wisconsin, United States
|
|-
| Win
|align=center| 1–1
| Rich Sherer
| TKO (punches)
| Brutaal: Fight Night
|
|align=center|1
|align=center|0:41
|Maplewood, Minnesota, United States
|
|-
| Loss
|align=center| 0–1
| Joe Lynch
| Submission (triangle choke)
| Brutaal: Fight Night
|
|align=center|2
|align=center|1:58
|Maplewood, Minnesota, United States
|
|-

See also
 List of male mixed martial artists

References

External links
Official UFC Profile

1985 births
American male mixed martial artists
Lightweight mixed martial artists
Mixed martial artists utilizing boxing
Mixed martial artists utilizing wrestling
Living people
Mixed martial artists from Iowa
Ultimate Fighting Championship male fighters